A maple bar is a rectangular doughnut topped with a maple glaze. They can be filled with custard, or cream, or left unfilled. Maple bars are prominent on the West coast of the United States and rarely in British Columbia, Canada. Tim Horton's and other Canadian doughnut shops does not sell maple bars.

Maple bars are also known as a maple-glazed Long John, Maple-Creamstick or maple Bismarck.

See also
 List of doughnut varieties
 List of breakfast foods
 List of foods made from maple
Maple bacon donut

References

External links

Bar
American doughnuts
Canadian doughnuts
Pacific Northwest cuisine